A tidal marsh (also known as a type of "tidal wetland") is a marsh found along rivers, coasts and estuaries which floods and drains by the tidal movement of the adjacent estuary, sea or ocean. Tidal marshes experience many overlapping persistent cycles, including diurnal and semi-diurnal tides, day-night temperature fluctuations, spring-neap tides, seasonal vegetation growth and decay, upland runoff, decadal climate variations, and centennial to millennial trends in sea level and climate. 

Tidal marshes are formed in areas that are sheltered from waves (such as beside edges of bays), in upper slops of intertidal, and where water is fresh or saline. They are also impacted by transient disturbances such as hurricanes, floods, storms, and upland fires.

In recent periods, human-caused changes in ecosystems have also had significant impact on the conservation of tidal marsh ecosystems: upstream erosion, coastal development, and larger system changes, such as a pollution and climate changed caused sea level rise are all putting significant pressure on tidal marshes.

Types
Tidal marshes are differentiated into freshwater, brackish and salt according to the salinity of their water. Coastal marshes lie along coasts and estuarine marshes lie inland within the tidal zone. Location determines the controlling processes, age, disturbance regime, and future persistence of tidal marshes. Tidal freshwater marshes are further divided into deltaic and fringing types. Extensive research has been conducted on deltaic tidal freshwater marshes in Chesapeake Bay, which were formed as a result of historic deforestation and intensive agriculture.

Tidal marshes can be further categorized by salinity level, elevation, and sea level. Tidal marshes are commonly zoned into lower marshes (also called intertidal marshes) and upper or high marshes, based on their elevation above sea level. A middle marsh zone also exists for tidal freshwater marshes.

Tidal marshes may be further classified into back-barrier marshes, estuarine brackish marshes and tidal freshwater marshes, depending on the influence of sea level.

Coastal
Coastal tidal marshes are found within coastal watersheds and encompass a variety of types including fresh and salt marshes, bottomland hardwood swamps, mangrove swamps, and palustrine wetlands.

Island and barrier island
Tidal Marshes also form between a main shoreline and barrier islands. These elongated shifting landforms evolve parallel and in close proximity to the shoreline of a tidal marsh. Many become fully submerged at high tide, and become directly attached to the mainland when at low tide. Barrier island formation includes mechanisms such as offshore bar theory, spit accretion theory, and climate change.

Ecosystem services 

Tidal marsh ecosystems provide numerous services, including supplying habitats to support a diverse range of biodiversity. Their areas are spawning grounds and home to "feeder fish" that lie low on the food chain, and serve as crucial rest-stops for migratory birds. Additionally, they provide suitable habitat to various tidal salt marsh specialist bird species, such as the seaside sparrow (Ammospiza maritima) and the willet (Tringa semipalmata) found in tidal marshes in Connecticut, U.S.

Other ecosystem services include their role as significant carbon sinks and shoreline stabilizers. Tidal marshes provide flood protection to upland areas by storing ground water, and lessen the impact of storm surges on nearby shorelines. Tidal marshes located along coastlines also act as intricate filtration systems for watersheds. These areas absorb and trap pollutants from water run-off that travels from higher elevations to open water.

Anthropogenic threats 
Historically, the global loss of tidal marshes can be attributed to the implementation of tidal restrictions and other draining activities. Tidal restrictions methods include diking, tide gates, and impoundments, which were implemented on coastal lands internationally in favour of creating agricultural land, as exemplified with large-scale diking that has occurred in Atlantic Canada and the U.S. (e.g. in The Bay of Fundy). 

Historical changes (due to anthropogenic activity) to tidal marshes have a lasting impact on them today. Tidal marshes have experienced the Gold Rush which filled some marshes with sediment due to erosion. Logging has also damaged tidal marshes due to their decomposition and filling of marshes. Tidal marshes sensitivity to anthropogenic activity have created long lasting affects.

Currently, rising sea levels is one of the leading threats to tidal marshes caused by global warming and climate change. Pollution due to urbanization also continues to endanger tidal marsh ecosystems.

Restoration 
Restoration of tidal marshes through the removal of tidal restrictions to re-establish degraded ecosystem services have been underway internationally for decades. Deliberate and natural restoration practices have occurred in the U.S., United Kingdom, Europe, and Canada. Research shows that tidal marsh restoration can be evaluated through various factors, such as vegetation, biogeochemical responses (e.g. salinity, sediment deposition, pH, and carbon sequestration), hydrologic responses, and wildlife community responses.

See also

References

External links 
 Tidal freshwater marsh

Coastal geography
Marshes